Tenkatsu may refer to:
 Tennenshoku Katsudō Shashin, abbreviated as Tenkatsu, a 1910s Japanese film studio
 Tenkasu or Tenkatsu, Japanese food